Gosho might refer to:

People

 Gosho clan, Japanese family
 Gosho Aoyama, Japanese manga artist
 Heinosuke Gosho, Japanese film director
 Gosho no Gorōmaru, Japanese samurai
Gosho Ginchev, Bulgarian footballer
Gosho Motoharu, Japanese martial artist

Places

 Kyoto Gosho (Kyoto Imperial Palace), former ruling palace of the Emperor of Japan
 Akasaka Gosho (Akasaka Palace), current residence of the Emperor of Japan
 Fukiage Gosho (Fukiage Palace), main residence of the Emperor of Japan
 Sentō Gosho (Sentō Imperial Palace), Emeritus Imperial Palace of Japan
 Yanagi-no-Gosho, a palace in Japan
 Horigoe Gosho, Horigoe Palace ruins archeological site

Gōshō-ji (disambiguation), a number of Buddhist temples in Japan, including:
Gōshō-ji (Takarazuka)
Gosho Park, a park in Zimbabwe
Gosho-ha Hyōhō Niten Ichi-ryū, Japanese martial arts school
Gosho Dam, a dam in Japan